The 1982 Tour de Romandie was the 36th edition of the Tour de Romandie cycle race and was held from 4 May to 9 May 1982. The race started in Meyrin and finished in Neuchâtel. The race was won by Jostein Wilmann of the Capri Sonne team.

General classification

References

1982
Tour de Romandie
May 1982 sports events in Europe
1982 Super Prestige Pernod